Yeshiva College (also Yeshivah College) can refer to:

Yeshivah College, Australia, an Orthodox Jewish day school for boys near Melbourne 
Yeshiva College, a Jewish day school run from 1956 to 2003 by Yeshivah Centre in Sydney, Australia
Yeshiva College of South Africa, a Jewish day school in Glenhazel, Johannesburg, Gauteng
Yeshiva College (Yeshiva University), undergraduate college for men in Manhattan, New York, United States
Yeshiva College of the Nation's Capital, part of Yeshiva of Greater Washington, in Silver Spring, Maryland, United States 
Ner Israel Yeshiva College, a Haredi yeshiva in Thornhill, Ontario, Canada